Michael Siklenka (born December 18, 1979) is a Canadian former professional ice hockey defenceman who played in the National Hockey League (NHL) for the Philadelphia Flyers and New York Rangers.

Playing career
Siklenka was played major junior hockey with the Seattle Thunderbirds of the Western Hockey League before he was drafted 118th overall in the 1998 NHL Entry Draft by the Washington Capitals.

He played in two NHL games, one with the Philadelphia Flyers and the other with the New York Rangers before opting for a European career in playing for Leksands IF of the Swedish Allsvenskan, Lukko of the Finnish SM-liiga, and EC KAC and EC Red Bull Salzburg of the Austrian EBEL.

On July 2, 2010, Siklenka signed a one-year contract with the Atlanta Thrashers of the NHL. He was unable to make the Thrashers opening night roster and was reassigned to American Hockey League affiliate, the Chicago Wolves, to start the 2010–11 season. 36 games with the Wolves, Siklenka sought a release from his contract and returned for a second spell with EC KAC of the EBEL on January 27, 2011.

Siklenka was a member of Team Canada for the 2007 Spengler Cup.

Personal life
Siklenka has a wife (Jolene) and two kids (Rain and Jones).

Career statistics

References

External links

1979 births
Living people
Canadian ice hockey defencemen
Chicago Wolves players
Hampton Roads Admirals players
Sportspeople from Meadow Lake, Saskatchewan
EC KAC players
Leksands IF players
Lloydminster Blazers players
Lukko players
New York Rangers players
Philadelphia Flyers players
Philadelphia Phantoms players
Portland Pirates players
EC Red Bull Salzburg players
Richmond Renegades players
Seattle Thunderbirds players
Trenton Titans players
Utah Grizzlies (AHL) players
Washington Capitals draft picks
Ice hockey people from Saskatchewan
Canadian expatriate ice hockey players in Austria
Canadian expatriate ice hockey players in Finland
Canadian expatriate ice hockey players in Sweden